Fernando López López (born February 7, 1984) is a Mexican former football defender, who last played for Bauger FC in the Liga Dominicana de Fútbol.

Career
Lopez made his debut with Irapuato against Morelia in the Apertura season of 2003 playing 16 games out of 19. He was transferred to Querétaro for a season. Then he was transferred to Atlante and won his first league title. He would be sent to Club Necaxa where he would enjoy success in helping his team reach the quarterfinals, where they would lose to Santos Laguna. Necaxa has confirmed that he is now on loan to Club America and he will play for the 2009–2010 season.

Honours
Atlante
Mexican Primera División: Apertura 2007

External links

1984 births
Living people
People from La Piedad
Footballers from Michoacán
Mexican footballers
Irapuato F.C. footballers
Querétaro F.C. footballers
Atlante F.C. footballers
Club Necaxa footballers
Club América footballers
Dorados de Sinaloa footballers
Liga MX players
Liga Dominicana de Fútbol players
Mexico under-20 international footballers
Mexican expatriate footballers
Expatriate footballers in the Dominican Republic
Association football defenders